Gursarai is a city and municipal board in the Jhansi district of the Indian state of Uttar Pradesh. Gursarai is situated in the Garautha Tehsil. An emerging city in Jhansi District With having an old and established market, it's a lifeline for the nearby village people who come and sell their farm produces.

History

The town of Gursarai was founded with a grant of land given to  the chief of the Peshwas of Malwa for his service during the Second Battle of Panipat. Mukundraj supposedly won the battle for the Peshwas by poisoning the food of a Mughal General when the latter visited the Peshwa court. This act led to the withdrawal of Mughal armies from the borders of the Malwa Empire.

Geography 

Gursarai is situated in Jhansi, Uttar Pradesh, India. It has the geographical coordinates 25° 37' 0" N, 79° 11' 0" E. Its original name was Pilaingura.

Demographics
Gursarai is a Nagar Palika Parishad (Municipal Board) city in the district of Jhansi, Uttar Pradesh. The city is divided into 25 wards, in which elections are held every five years. As of 2011, the population of Gursarai Nagar Palika Parishad was 26,869, with 14,127 males and 12,742 females, as described in the 2011 Census of India.

There are 3266 children aged 0-6 in Gursarai, comprising 12.16% of the population. The female sex ratio is 902 compared to the average of 912 in Uttar Pradesh. The child sex ratio in Gursarai is around 851 females per 1,000 males, compared to an Uttar Pradesh state average of 902 females per 1,000 males. The literacy rate in Gursarai is 83.65%, which is higher than the state average of 67.68%. Male literacy is around 91.75% and female literacy is around 74.75%.

8,217 people in Gursarai are officially engaged in work or business activities, of which 7,054 are males and 1,163 are females. Of the total working population, 71.71% of workers were engaged in 'main work' while 28.29% of workers were engaged in 'marginal work.'

The Gursarai Nagar Palika Parishad (Gursarai Municipal Board) has administration over 4,920 houses, to which it supplies basic amenities like water and sewage. It is also authorized to build roads within the Nagar Palika Parishad area and impose taxes on properties under its jurisdiction.

Religion 
Table showing the religious composition of Gursarai:

Education 
K-12 education and schools of higher education are available in Gursarai. The degree colleges in Gursarai are affiliated with Bundelkhand University.

Higher education 

 JN Modi Mahavidyalaya
 Dr. Ram Manohar Lohia Girls College

Schools   
 Kher Inter College Girls
 GIC
 Prathmik Vidyalaya
 St. Mary's School
 T.M.A.R.Kher Inter College
 Shree Kalyan Bal Vidhya Mandir
 Shree Mahaveer Bal Shiksha Sanskar Kendra
 K.C. Jain Memorial Public School
 S.R.S Public School
Vedic International School
 Buds N Blooms School
 P.S.D Arjaria School
 Gursarai Kids Academy School

Significant Locations 
Bada Talab near Badi Mata Mandir
Inderdan group of Talab near petrol pump on Mauranipur Road
Siddha Baba Temple, Earch Road.
Bhasneh Talab and nature reserve
Hulki Mata Mandir
Historical Hill Madori
Badi Mata Mandir Madori

References

Cities and towns in Jhansi district
Bundelkhand